Shagird is a 2011 Indian Hindi-language action thriller film directed by Tigmanshu Dhulia starring Nana Patekar as Hanumant Singh, Mohit Ahlawat as Mohit Kumar and Rimi Sen as Varsha Mathur. The film released on 13 May 2011. Despite a positive critical reception, the film failed to perform well commercially.

Plot 

The film starts with gangster Bunty Bhaiya being arrested in Ghaziabad. In Delhi, Mohit Kumar is about to join the Crime branch as a sub-inspector under Senior inspector Hanumant Singh. There he meets Singh’s team, which is taking bribes from a builder and their commission from the land mafia lord who is threatening the builder’s life.

On arrival, he asks for Hanumant Singh where Rathi tells him that Hanumant Singh is not a human, he is in between humans and God. He is afraid of God, and Humans are afraid of Hanumant Singh.

Meanwhile, Hanumant Singh visits land mafia lord Choudhary as a Land owner from Rajasthan, where he kills him and his gang members. Two of the remaining gang members escapes and hides in a house. There they are surrounded by police. Shortly a news crew arrives to lead by Varsha Mathur from the Aaj Tak news channel to cover the ongoing incident. There Hanumant takes their camera and goes to the door of the house where gang members are hiding. There he pretends to be a camera man from the news channel, and as soon as they open the door, he shoots them. Later he tells the media that both were wanted, terrorists. Later he is joined by his teammates and takes Mohit for a drive. On the other side of the city, a person comes and threatens Hanumant’s wife of killing Hanumant and his whole family if he doesn’t stop doing his mischievous activities.

Hanumant takes Mohit to a hotel and asks him how he joined Crime Branch directly and about his hobbies and personal life. He later drops him to a party and goes home. Where on arrival, police informs him that gunshots were fired on his house. He tells his wife to leave India as soon as she gets her passport.

Bunty bhaiya has been transferred to Delhi jail, where he is treated as a high-profile personality by the jailer. In jail, Bunty befriends with two terrorists of Lashkar-e-Haq. Hanumant takes Mohit to Rajmani’s (politician) birthday. There Rajmani tells him to encounter Ali tonight at his birthday party.

Before encountering Ali, he tells Hanumant of the drug deal going to take place, which Hanumant sabotages and takes money and drugs with him. In the drug deal encounter, Mohit saves Hanumant's life in the nick of a time. Later, Hanumant sends his wife and son to New-Zealand for their own safety. In the meantime, three journalists are kidnapped by a terrorist who asks for the release of their mates and Bunty bhaiya from Tihar jail.

When the government releases the three, Hanumant kills the two terrorists and takes Bunty into his safe house. Its later revealed that Hanumant was actually behind the kidnapping. Meanwhile, Mohit tips Hanumant about their colleague Shamsher Rana trying to kill him on instructions of Rajmani. Alert, Hanumant, in turn, kills Shamsher, faking it as a suicide case. Then Hanumant demands 15 crore from Rajmani for his release else he will post the video of Bunty's confessions to the media.

Hanumant is shot down, where Mohit shows his presence of mind and admits him to the hospital. In the hospital, Hanumant realizes that Mohit was all along working for Rajamani. Even though Mohit is planning to eliminate Hanumant, he agrees to share his ransom money for Mohit to save his life during the drug deal encounter, which genuine attempt, unlike the other attempts made to gain his confidence. Then both of them chalk out a plan to make money from Rajmani.

After increasing the deal from 15 to 25 crore by sending a video recording of Bunty with Mohit in the video (which he wasn't aware of), Rajmani agreed on the deal and gives Mohit the money. Mohit shows up at the place as directed by Hanumant and drives off to meet him. In the end, when Hanumant and Mohit divide their share of the money, and part ways, not knowing there is a transponder in the case. Hanumant had some children call Rajmani Bunty's location, and they rush off to the location. Upon entering Rajmani's car, Bunty was shot dead by Rajmani, and they continue to the parliament. Not realising the reporters are watching, Rajmani is captured by the police in a road block when they saw Bunty's dead body in the car.

Mohit is killed by Rajmani's people after a car chase in which he kills them all too... Later, when Hanumant goes to send money to his family through Kamlesh (Veerendra Saxena), who helps him send money when he needs to, he is shot twice by Kamlesh . Kamlesh tells him that he also has a family to feed, and that he has never seen such a big amount in his whole life, and that has made him disloyal. Kamlesh then shoots him a third time before walking out with the money. He then dials a number - it is shown that Mohit's cell keeps on ringing on the road where he lies dead, assuming Mohit arranged the plot, and walks off.

Hanumanth dies listening to old Hindi songs playing on the TV.

Cast

Soundtrack 
This movie feature only one track "Kaisi Talab Hai" sung by Kunal Ganjawala composed by Abhishek Ray music on T-Series.

Critical reception 
Nikhat Kazmi of The Times of India gave the movie a 3 star rating saying "Watch the film for its topicality. Shagird holds up a hard-hitting mirror on India: corrupt to the core, India: permanently scarred by the unholy nexus between tainted politicians, ruthless gangsters and dishonest cops." Taran Adarsh called the movie a power packed and well made film but blamed the awareness and low hype for the movie giving it a 3/5 star rating.

Music 
The music was composed by music director Abhishek Ray.

References

External links
 

2011 films
Films scored by Abhishek Ray
Indian action thriller films
Indian police films
Reliance Entertainment films
Films directed by Tigmanshu Dhulia
2011 action thriller films
2010s Hindi-language films
Fictional portrayals of the Delhi Police
Films set in Delhi
Films set in Uttar Pradesh